Khaneh Sar (also Romanized as Khāneh Sar) is a village in Harzandat-e Sharqi Rural District, in the Central District of Marand County, East Azerbaijan Province, Iran. At the 2006 census, its population was 106, in 30 families.

References 

Populated places in Marand County